Sipahioğlu is a Turkish surname. It is derived from Persian سپاهی (sepāhī) with the meaning "soldier". People with the surname include:
 Duygu Sipahioğlu (born 1979), Turkish volleyball player
 Gökşin Sipahioğlu (1926–2011), Turkish photographer and photojournalist
 Halil İbrahim Sipahioğlu (1862–1947), Turkish politician
 İlhan Sipahioğlu (1922–1981), Turkish politician

References

Turkish-language surnames
Patronymic surnames